Highway 922 is a provincial highway in the north-west region of the Canadian province of Saskatchewan. It runs from Highway 55 near Bodmin to Highway 916. Highway 922 is about 93 km (58 mi) long.

Highway 922 provides access to Delaronde Lake and several provincial recreation sites. It also connects with Highway 940 and Highway 923.

See also 
Roads in Saskatchewan
Transportation in Saskatchewan

References 

922